The Men's Double Sculls took place at the Lagoa Rodrigo de Freitas. The race for lanes happened on July 15 and the Final on July 18.

Medals

Race for Lanes

Final

Rowing at the 2007 Pan American Games